Kirkcaldy United Football Club, which started life as Kirkcaldy Amateurs in 1901–02 season. Then after just two seasons it was decided that they become Kirkcaldy's second senior club (Raith Rovers being the other).

They played their early games on an open field at Overton Park. In 1905 they moved into their new home, a purpose-built park named Scott's Park. It was situated at the corner of Factory Road and Kidd Street. After World War 1 this section of Factory Road was renamed Beatty Crescent.

The club twice won of the Fife Cup, in 1906–07 & 1912–13. On 2 March 1907, they beat Cowdenbeath 3–1 at Stark's Park in front of 2,160 people to win the 1906–07 competition, and on 30 April 1913 they beat East Fife 5–2 at the same venue in front of a crowd of 2,000.

Kircaldy United played in numerous leagues, (Northern, Central and Eastern). They were joint winners of the 1906–07 Northern League with Dundee 'A'.

In 1908 it was proposed by Raith Rovers that both clubs look into the possibility of amalgamation, though nothing came of this. Kircaldy United disbanded at the end of season 1915–16.

References

Defunct football clubs in Scotland
Association football clubs established in 1901
Association football clubs disestablished in 1916
1901 establishments in Scotland
1916 disestablishments in Scotland
Football clubs in Fife
Kirkcaldy